N-Oleyl-1,3-propanediamine is an organic compound and a diamine with the formula C21H44N2. It has found use in numerous industries. The main producer of commercial N-Oleyl-1,3-propanediamine is AkzoNobel, who sells it under the name Duomeen OL.

Uses 
N-Oleyl-1,3-propanediamine is used as a catalyst in the production of urethanes and epoxies. It is used as a emulsifier in the making of asphalt, an ore flotation agent, and a dispersant for some paints. It has also found use as a lubricant due to its unreactivity with cations, which are present in some adhesive manufacturing.

References

Diamines
Cationic surfactants